Miller Homes is a housebuilder based in the United Kingdom.

History
The company was established by Sir James Miller in 1934. Expansion led to James' brothers, John and Lawrence, joining him in the business. Miller soon became Edinburgh's leading housebuilder, building close to five hundred houses a year during the 1930s.

The Second World War led to the cessation of private housebuilding and the start of Miller's now extensive construction business. The return to housing after 1945 was driven by local authority work, and it was not until the end of building controls in the beginning of the 1950s, that Miller Homes resumed private housing – often on its extensive pre-war land holdings.

Housing operations were later extended to the South East England and Yorkshire. However, the group's emphasis was more on its construction activities, and housing sales rarely exceeded five hundred to six hundred a year.

The company's housing subsidiary in the South of England was sold to Kier Group in May 1996, but, despite that, sales in the following year exceeded 1,000 for the first time. The then managing director announced his ambition to move into the top ten housebuilders in the UK.

In September 2005, the company acquired Fairclough Homes (then building 1,500 houses a year) taking Miller to its target of 4,000 houses a year, although volumes fell substantially in the recession that followed. In July 2014, the company sold its construction division to Galliford Try.

The company was acquired by Apollo Global Management in April 2022.

References

External links
 

2022 mergers and acquisitions
Companies based in Edinburgh
Construction and civil engineering companies established in 1934
1934 establishments in Scotland
Housebuilding companies of the United Kingdom
Construction and civil engineering companies of Scotland
Privately held companies of Scotland
Property companies of Scotland
British companies established in 1934